Chain of Lakes is a group of lakes in South Dakota, in the United States.

The group of lakes is classified as a lake chain, hence the name.

See also
List of lakes in South Dakota

References

Lakes of South Dakota
Lakes of Codington County, South Dakota